Maria Magdalene Schoch (February 15, 1897, Würzburg - November 6, 1987, Falls Church, Fairfax, Virginia) was a German lawyer and in 1932 the first woman in Germany to habilitate in the law. In 1937, she emigrated to the United States for political reasons, where she continued her work.  She earned her doctor of laws in 1920 from the University of Würzburg, her thesis being "English War Legislation Against Enemy Corporations" and thereafter became a research assistant to Albert Mendelssohn-Bartholdy.

References

1897 births
1987 deaths
20th-century German lawyers
German women lawyers
People from Würzburg
German emigrants to the United States
University of Würzburg alumni
Jurists from Bavaria
20th-century women lawyers
20th-century German women